Jefferson Park is a  neighborhood in the South region of the City of  Los Angeles, California. There are five Historic-Cultural Monuments in the neighborhood. In 1987, the Jefferson branch library was added to the National Register of Historic Places.

History

With development commencing around the turn of the 20th century, Jefferson Park began as one of the city's wealthiest neighborhoods. On the hill rising west of Western Avenue, wealthy white Angelenos built luxury Edwardian, Craftsman, and Art Deco mansions, with churches and commercial buildings of commensurate expense. In 1903 there were trolley cars  running down Jefferson and Adams Boulevard.  In the flatter areas along Jefferson Boulevard, a low-rise commercial corridor developed, with small single-story homes and low-rise apartment buildings in the blocks behind. After the 1948 Supreme Court ruling that banned racial covenants on property, most of Jefferson Park's white population decamped to other parts of the region, in turn being replaced by upper-middle and upper-class blacks whose descendants still reside in many of the district's spectacular homes.

Jefferson Park saw an influx of Creole peoples in the post-World War II period. The resulting area was dubbed "Little New Orleans" and contained a number of Creole owned businesses such as the Big Loaf Bakery and Harold and Belle’s, an upscale creole restaurant.

In September 1998, the "Jefferson Park Gateway Monument" was unveiled at the corner of Crenshaw Boulevard and Jefferson Boulevard.  According to then-councilman Nate Holden, the project was a sign of the ongoing revitalization of the area. In 2014, the Los Angeles Times reported that "once-struggling neighborhoods" like Jefferson Park were now experiencing soaring home prices as young professionals were purchasing the Craftsman homes in the community and new shops and restaurants were opening up.

Geography

According to the city of Los Angeles and the Los Angeles Times, Jefferson Park is bounded by Adams Boulevard on the north, Exposition Boulevard on the south, Crenshaw Boulevard on the west and Western Avenue on the east.

It became an official city neighborhood in 1988, with then-mayor Tom Bradley attending the event. Neighborhood signs are installed along Jefferson Boulevard and Exposition Boulevard.

According to the Mapping L.A. project of the Los Angeles Times, the  neighborhood touches West Adams Terrace to the north, Adams-Normandie to the east, the Exposition Park residential neighborhood on the southeast and Leimert Park on the south.

Historic Preservation Overlay Zone

The Jefferson Park HPOZ was adopted by City Council in 2011.  The preservation plan offers guidelines for both commercial and residential structures in the community. 
 The HPOZ does not cover the entire Jefferson Park neighborhood.  The HPOZ is bounded by Adams Boulevard on the north, 7th Avenue on the west, Exposition Boulevard on the south (from Crenshaw Boulevard to Arlington Avenue), and Jefferson Boulevard on the south (from Arlington Avenue to Western Avenue). Street signs in the area have an additional sign to indicate that the street is part of the HPOZ area.

Population

A total of 23,130 people lived in the neighborhood's 1.42 square miles, according to the 2000 U.S. census—averaging 16,300 people per square mile, among the highest population density in the city as a whole. The median age was 31, about the same as the rest of the city.

Within the neighborhood, African Americans made up 46.8% of the population, with Latinos 44.9%, Asian 2.9%, non-Hispanic Whites 2.7% and others 2.7%. Mexico and El Salvador were the most common places of birth for the 32.7% of the residents who were born abroad, considered an average percentage of foreign-born when compared with the city or county as a whole.

The median household income in 2008 dollars was $32,654, considered low when compared with all city and county neighborhoods. The percentage of households earning $20,000 or less was high, compared to the county at large. The average household size of 2.8 people was about the same as the rest of the city. Renters occupied 69.5% of the housing units, and homeowners occupied the rest.

In 2000, there were 1,365 families headed by single parents, or 26.6%, a rate that was high for the county and the city.

Jefferson Park residents aged 25 and older holding a four-year degree amounted to 11.8% of the population in 2000, considered low when compared with the city and the county as a whole; the percentage of residents aged 25 and older with a high school diploma was also considered low.

Education

Schools within the Jefferson Park boundaries are:

 Joseph Pomeroy Widney High, LAUSD, special education, 2302 South Gramercy Place
 Mid City Magnet, LAUSD alternative, 3150 West Adams Boulevard
 Celerity Nascent Charter, LAUSD, 3417 West Jefferson Boulevard
 Sixth Avenue Elementary, LAUSD, 3109 Sixth Avenue
 Holy Name of Jesus Catholic Elementary, private, 1955 West Jefferson Boulevard.  The school was founded in 1924 by families from New Orleans. It celebrates its Creole heritage with a music program in which every child in the school learns to read music and to play a musical instrument.

Parks and Libraries

 Leslie N. Shaw Park - 2250 West Jefferson Boulevard.
 Jefferson-Vassie D. Wright Memorial Branch Library - 2211 W. Jefferson Boulevard.  In 1987, the Jefferson branch library was added to the National Register of Historic Places.

Historic-Cultural Monuments

 Walker Mansion - 3300 W Adams Boulevard. Designated Historic-Cultural Monument 419 on March 3, 1989 
 Briggs Residence - 3734 W Adams Boulevard. Designated Historic-Cultural Monument 477 on January 30, 1990.
 Guasti Villa/Busby Berkeley Estate - 3500 W Adams Boulevard. Designated Historic-Cultural Monument 478 on January 30, 1990.
 Glen Lukens Home and Studio. Designed by pioneering midcentury Modernist Raphael Soriano for ceramicist Glen Lukens. Designated Historic-Cultural Monument 866 on April 11, 2007.
 Hauerwaas Kusayanagi Residence - 3741 W 27th Street  Designated Historic-Cultural Monument 990 on October 27, 2010.

Landmarks and attractions
 Trinity Baptist Church - 2040 W. Jefferson Boulevard.  Originally located at 36th and Normandie, it moved to its present location in 1948.  The master plan for the church was designed by noted African-American architect Paul Williams.
 Westminster Presbyterian Church - 2230 West Jefferson Boulevard. Established in 1904, is one of the oldest African-American Presbyterian churches in California.

Transportation

 The Metro E Line has two stations in Jefferson Park, both along Jefferson Boulevard: Expo/Crenshaw station and Expo/Western station. As of October 7, 2022, the Expo/Crenshaw station serves as a transfer point between the E Line and the Metro K Line.
 Metro Local bus routes 14, 35, 37, 38, 207 and 209 also servers Jefferson Park.

References

External links
 

 Jefferson Park Historic Neighborhood Profile at The Los Angeles Conservancy
 Huell Howser video from 2003 about Jefferson Park in his "Our Neighborhoods" series, hosted by Chapman University, home of the Huell Howser archive.

 
Neighborhoods in Los Angeles
South Los Angeles